Christian Elizardo Pérez Gómez (born March 18, 1990) is a Uruguayan footballer who plays as a central midfielder for Rampla Juniors in the Uruguayan Segunda División, on loan from River Plate.

Career
Pérez began his career in 2013 with Central Español, where he played for one season. Then, he moved to Torque and played there for two seasons in Uruguayan Segunda División. Since June 2015, Pérez plays for River Plate.

References

1990 births
Living people
Uruguayan footballers
Club Atlético River Plate (Montevideo) players
Association football midfielders
Uruguayan Primera División players
Central Español players